Tomales High School is located in the town of Tomales, California, United States. It is the comprehensive high school of the Shoreline Unified School District. Tomales High School was recognized as a California Distinguished School in 2011.

History 
Tomales Union High School opened on Aug. 5, 1912, with 23 students and one teacher/principal located on a hill in downtown Tomales. The school grew quickly: before the two-classroom school was a decade old, it was expanded to 10 classrooms thanks to a $30,000 school bond. The California Field Act mandates that all the state’s public schools be earthquake safe, and Shoreline School District trustees in the 1960s were faced with either retrofitting the old school or building a new one. Bond elections to finance various options followed and were twice narrowly defeated. In 1967 a third election was successful. Affirmative votes in all precincts except Inverness resulted in an overall 73 percent approval for the $1.1 million bond to finance a new high school. In 1969, the new high school opened along Tomales-Petaluma Road. Much of the school was extensively remodeled in 2011.

Tomales High teams were originally called the Wolves, but in 1950, the name was changed to the Braves. In 2001, Shoreline School District trustees decided the name was disrespectful to Native Americans and voted to change it. Many district residents objected, including several Miwok descendants who said the name had been changed to Braves to honor them. The Trustees voted to keep the name Braves but to drop the Indian image.

About Tomales High School 
Tomales High serves the greater Tomales Bay and Bodega Bay communities in Marin County and Sonoma County as the comprehensive high school of the Shoreline Unified School District. The school serves an area famous for its oyster, ranching, and fishing industries.

Tomales High is fed by Tomales Elementary School and West Marin Elementary School. Tomales Elementary serves the northwest Marin communities of Tomales, Dillon Beach, Fallon, and Marhsall as well as the Sonoma County communities of Valley Ford, Bloomfield and parts of rural western Petaluma. Students from the Sonoma Coast towns of Bodega and Bodega Bay attend Bodega Bay Elementary and feed into Tomales for middle and high school. West Marin Elementary School serves the southern end of the Shoreline Unified School District including the West Marin communities of Point Reyes Station, Inverness, and Olema.

Demographics 
Student enrollment has declined steadily from 295 in 1998-99 (including adjoining Shoreline High School) to an all-time low of 169 in 2008-09. Since then enrollment has remained steady between 170 and 190 students.

Tomales High demographics:

Athletics 
The Tomales Braves are a member of the North Coast Section. The Braves compete in the Coastal Mountain Conference and are a member of the North Central League II.

Football 
The Braves have a strong tradition reaching the North Coast Section playoffs from 1991-2004 and 2006-2012. The Braves have won five NCS titles (1983, 1995, 1998, 2001, 2002) and have been section runner-up five times (1992, 2004, 2006, 2010, 2011). The Braves won six straight NCL II league titles (2006-2011) and went 36-0-1 in that stretch. Head Coach Leon Feliciano was named the 2011 North Coast Section Honor Coach. Since 1996 he has led the Braves to a 137-69-4 record. Feliciano retired after the 2014 season.

Basketball 

Howard Wilson has served as the boys' head coach since 2011-12. He retired after the 2014-2015 season, after leading the Braves to back to back North Coast Section Playoff appearances.

Chris Kenyon led the Lady Braves to a 2011 NCS Division VI title. He retired after the 2014 campaign.

Baseball 
Bill Tucker was at the helm from 1995-2015, winning a North Coast Section Championship in 2013. The Braves were NCS Runners-up in 2007, 2009, and 2015.

Other sports 
Football
Cheerleading
Basketball
Volleyball
Tennis
Soccer
Softball
Baseball

References 

High schools in Marin County, California
Public high schools in California
1912 establishments in California